"Soley Soley" is a song by Scottish band Middle of the Road, released as a single in August 1971. It peaked at number 5 in the UK Singles Chart and also topped the charts in some countries.

Release
"Soley Soley" was written by Spanish musician Fernando Arbex and was recorded by Middle of the Road whilst they were in Spain. It was first released in the Netherlands in August 1971 and was released in the UK on 26 November 1971. The B-side, "To Remind Me", was written by Lally Stott, brothers Giosy and Mario Capuano, and Middle of the Road lead singer Sally Carr.

Track listings
7"
 "Soley Soley" – 3:02
 "To Remind Me" – 3:28

Charts

Weekly charts

Year-end charts

References

1971 singles
Ultratop 50 Singles (Flanders) number-one singles
Ultratop 50 Singles (Wallonia) number-one singles
Dutch Top 40 number-one singles
Number-one singles in Norway
Number-one singles in South Africa
Number-one singles in Sweden
Number-one singles in Switzerland
Number-one singles in Zimbabwe
Middle of the Road songs
RCA Victor singles
1971 songs